Rešad Kunovac (born 24 August 1953) is a Bosnian football coach and former player. He was the assistant to Radomir Antić, the head coach of the Serbian national team at the 2010 FIFA World Cup.

Playing career
He started his career playing for FK Sutjeska Foča and FK Sloboda Užice in late 1960s, and later moved on to FK Partizan, where he took the championship crown in the 1975–76 Yugoslav First League season. He also played with FK Napredak Kruševac.

He played in the Major Indoor Soccer League in the United States under the name of Ray Kunovac.

Managerial career
After ending his playing career, Kunovac became a long-term assistant coach of Radomir Antić at Atlético de Madrid, FC Barcelona and Real Oviedo. In 2001, he was an assistant coach to Milovan Đorić, head coach of the FR Yugoslavia national football team. He was an assistant coach to Mirko Jozić at the 1990 UEFA European Under-16 Championship.

References

External links
MISL stats

1953 births
Living people
People from Foča
Association football defenders
Yugoslav footballers
FK Sutjeska Foča players
FK Sloboda Užice players
FK Partizan players
FK Napredak Kruševac players
Memphis Americans players
Baltimore Blast (1980–1992) players
Yugoslav First League players
Major Indoor Soccer League (1978–1992) players
Yugoslav expatriate footballers
Expatriate soccer players in the United States
Yugoslav expatriate sportspeople in the United States
Bosnia and Herzegovina football managers
FC Barcelona non-playing staff
Bosnia and Herzegovina expatriate sportspeople in China